World Computer Chess Championship (WCCC) is an event held periodically since 1974 where computer chess engines compete against each other. The event is organized by the International Computer Games Association (ICGA, until 2002 ICCA). It is often held in conjunction with the World Computer Speed Chess Championship and the Computer Olympiad, a collection of computer tournaments for other board games. Instead of using engine protocols, the games are played on physical boards by human operators.

The WCCC is open to all types of computers including microprocessors, supercomputers, clusters, and dedicated chess hardware.

Championship results 
In 2007, the reigning champion Junior declined to defend its title. 

For the 2009 edition, the rules were changed to limit platforms to commodity hardware supporting at most eight cores, thereby excluding supercomputers and large clusters. However, this was reversed in the following year and a parallel Software Championship was held instead; unlimited hardware is once again allowed in the championship proper.

World Chess Software Championship
From 2010 a new tournament was introduced and held at the same location and during the same period as the World Computer Chess Championship. The rules for the World Chess Software Championship  (WCSC) state that competing programs must run on machines with identical hardware specifications. Time control is game in 45 minutes with 15 second increment.

Due to the requirement to be present on-site, play on a physical board, and strict rules of originality, many strong programs refrain from participating in the ICGA events. As the conditions of the software championship can easily be emulated by anyone with a high-end PC, there are now privately conducted tournaments, such as Top Chess Engine Championship, that have much broader attendance, as well as a larger number of games to reduce the influence of chance.

World Microcomputer Chess Championship

From 1980 to 2001, the ICCA/ICGA organized a separate cycle of championships limited to programs running on microprocessors. In the first three championships, the winners were dedicated chess computers, and then in 1984, Richard Lang's Psion program shared first place, running on an IBM PC under MS-DOS.

At the 14th WMCCC in Jakarta, the Israeli team Junior was denied entry to Indonesia and some other teams dropped out in protest.

The 16th WMCCC was the same as the 9th WCCC above.

See also
 Chess engine
 Computer chess
 Computer Olympiad
 World Computer Speed Chess Championship
 Chess.com Computer Chess Championship
 Top Chess Engine Championship

References

External links
Official website of the International Computer Games Association (ICGA)

Computer
Computer chess competitions
Recurring events established in 1974